Harare Province, which includes the city of Harare, is the most populous of Zimbabwe's ten provinces, with over two million inhabitants in 2012. Manicaland Province and Midlands Province are the second and third most populous provinces, respectively. Seven of the ten provinces have a population larger than one million. Only three, Bulawayo, Matabeleland North and Matabeleland South are the least populous provinces. According to 2012 census data, Bulawayo is the least populous province, with around 650,000 inhabitants, though the city/provincial government disputes these statistics, arguing that they are politically motivated. Bulawayo produced its own municipal statistics showing a population 1.2 million. Depending on which data is accepted, either Bulawayo or Matabeleland South is the country's least populous province.

List by current population

Historical population data

Since independence

References 

Zimbabwean provinces
Zimbabwean provinces, population
population
Provinces by population